Ze'ev Haimovich (born 7 April 1983) is an Israeli former footballer.

Biography
Haimovich was born in Netanya to a mother from Odessa and father from Transcarpathia. He grew up speaking Russian at home.

Transfer to Russia
On 1 August 2009, the vice-president of Terek Grozny Khaidar Alhanov, announced the arrival from Maccabi Netanya of Haimovich. He signed a three-year deal worth $1.3m and became the second Israeli player to ever compete in the Russian League, after Idan Shum.

Return to Israel
On 18 July 2012, Haimovich returned to play in Israel by signing at Hapoel Tel Aviv for two years.

Honours

Hapoel Petah Tikva
Toto Cup (1):
2004–05

Hapoel Ramat Gan F.C.
State Cup(1):
 2013

Footnotes

External links
soccerterminal

1983 births
Living people
Israeli footballers
Association football defenders
Beitar Nes Tubruk F.C. players
Hapoel Ra'anana A.F.C. players
Hapoel Petah Tikva F.C. players
Bnei Yehuda Tel Aviv F.C. players
Maccabi Netanya F.C. players
FC Akhmat Grozny players
Hapoel Tel Aviv F.C. players
Hapoel Ramat Gan F.C. players
Beitar Jerusalem F.C. players
Israel under-21 international footballers
Israel international footballers
Liga Leumit players
Israeli Premier League players
Russian Premier League players
Footballers from Netanya
Israeli expatriate footballers
Expatriate footballers in Russia
Israeli expatriate sportspeople in Russia
Israeli people of Ukrainian-Jewish descent